This is a list of public housing estates in Hong Kong. Many of them are properties of Hong Kong Housing Authority (HKHA), while some of them are properties of Hong Kong Housing Society (HKHS).

Central and Western District

Sai Wan (Kennedy Town)

Wan Chai District

Tai Hang

Eastern District

Chai Wan and Siu Sai Wan

Shau Kei Wan

Quarry Bay and North Point

Southern District

Ap Lei Chau

Aberdeen, Kellett Bay and Waterfall Bay

Stanley

Yau Tsim Mong District

Yau Ma Tei

Sham Shui Po District

Cheung Sha Wan

Sham Shui Po

Shek Kip Mei

Kowloon City District

Hung Hom, To Kwa Wan, Ma Tau Wai

Ho Man Tin

Kai Tak development area

Wong Tai Sin District

Wong Tai Sin (Chuk Yuen)

Diamond Hill

Lok Fu (Lo Fu Ngam) and Wang Tau Hom

Ngau Chi Wan

Tsz Wan Shan 

Note: all the estates in Tsz Wan Shan, except Sha Tin Au Estate, have been rebuilt from former Tsz Wan Shan Estate, which was built in 1964 and demolished in 1990.

Kwun Tong District

Kwun Tong

Ngau Tau Kok and Kowloon Bay

Lam Tin

Shun Lee

Yau Tong

Sau Mau Ping

Tai Sheung Tok

Sai Kung District

Sai Kung Town

Tseung Kwan O

Kwai Tsing District

Kwai Chung

Tsing Yi

Tsuen Wan District

Tuen Mun District

Yuen Long District

Au Tau

Hung Shui Kiu

Yuen Long Town

Tin Shui Wai

North District

Fanling

Sheung Shui

Sha Tau Kok

Tai Po District

Sha Tin District

Tai Wai

Sha Tin

Fo Tan

Islands District

Cheung Chau

Mui Wo

Peng Chau

Tai O

Tung Chung

See also
 Public housing in Hong Kong
 Interim Housing
 List of Home Ownership Scheme courts in Hong Kong
 Hong Kong Housing Authority Exhibition Centre

Notes
"Name" is the official name in English according to the Housing Authority
"Inaug" is the date of occupation of the earliest phase (if applicable)
"Type" - "Public" is traditional public rental housing; "Mixed" refers to projects where separate blocks earmarked for rental or sale; "Semi-private" refers to estates which have implemented TPS "right to buy" schemes
numbers of occupational units  may vary, as they refer not to numbers of units constructed, but unsold units per latest official information

References
 Complete list of PRH/TPS Estates
 Hong Kong Housing Society

 
Housing estates
.